Skhidnytsia is an urban-type settlement in Lviv Oblast, Western Ukraine. The settlement is part of Drohobych Raion, and represented by local Skhidnytska settlement council. Skhidnytsia hosts the administration of Skhidnytsia settlement hromada, one of the hromadas of Ukraine. Population: .

Description

The settlement of Skhidnytsia was first mentioned in the documents of the 15th century.

Skhidnytsia is known for its deposits mineral waters. For today there are 38 sources and 17 wells with different chemical composition of mineral water.

Until 18 July 2020, Skhidnytsia belonged to Boryslav Municipality. As part of the administrative reform of Ukraine, which reduced the number of raions of Lviv Oblast to seven, Boryslav Municipality was merged into Drohobych Raion.

Synagogue 
The only wooden synagogue in Ukraine that was not destroyed during World War II stands in Skhidnytsia.
It was built in the late 19th century. The simple building has 12 windows and was in use up to the German invasion in 1941.

Gallery

References

External links 

 The Skhidnytsia resort

Urban-type settlements in Drohobych Raion